Tell es-Sweyhat is the name of a large archaeological site on the Euphrates River in northern Syria. It is located in Raqqa Governorate roughly 95 km northeast of Aleppo and 60 km south of Carchemish. Also, a Uruk site of Jebel Aruda and a Bronze Age site Tell Hadidi (Azu) are located just across the river.

History
Sweyhat dates from 3100–1900 BC, or the Early Bronze Age and the very beginning of the Middle Bronze Age.  The site covers approximately 45 hectares and consists of a central, high mound standing 15 meters above the surrounding plain and an extensive low mound surrounded by the remains of an earthen rampart.  The site is located within Mesopotamia in a very marginal environment for agriculture, yet in antiquity it was a prosperous city. The site was also occupied during the Hellenistic Period.

Archaeology
Sweyhat is best known for its intact fortifications of the mid-to-late 3rd millennium BC and its late-3rd-millennium temple located at the summit of the high mound.  In 1993, the Penn excavators discovered a large cemetery of shaft-and-chamber tombs in the Low Mound dating to the mid 3rd millennium BC.  Sweyhat is a classic example of a Kranzhugel (German, "crown-mound") — a form of ruin mound typical of the Bronze Age in northwestern Mesopotamia consists of a high mound surrounded by a lower ring mound.

Sweyhat was excavated by Thomas Holland for the Ashmolean Museum, Oxford University in 1973–75.
These excavations were part of the Tabqa Dam Salvage Project, initiated to save sites threatened by the formation of the impound lake, Lake Assad, behind a hydroelectric dam on the Euphrates River near the town of Tabqa.  These excavations were renewed by Holland from the Oriental Institute of Chicago and Richard L. Zettler  from the University of Pennsylvania Museum in 1989.  This joint project excavated the site in 1989 and 1991.  The Oriental Institute excavated again in 1992 and then halted operations at the site.
Zettler carried out field seasons for the UPM in 1993, 1995, 1998, 2000, 2001, 2005, and 2007.  The project, which ended in 2010, was directed by Michael D. Danti of Boston University's Department of Archaeology. Among their finds were three Early Bronze Age tombs, one of which had not been robbed.

Tell Hajji Ibrahim is another important Uruk site in the area.

Notes

References
Holland, Thomas A. 1975.  An Inscribed Weight from Tell Sweyhat, Syria. Iraq 37: 75-76.
Zettler, Richard L., ed. 1997.  Subsistence and Settlement in a Marginal Environment: Tell es-Sweyhat, 1989–1995 Preliminary Report. MASCA Research Papers in Science and Archaeology 14 (Philadelphia: Museum Applied Sciences Center for Archaeology) 
Danti, Michael D. and Richard L. Zettler. 1998. The Evolution of the Tell es-Sweyhat (Syria) Settlement System in the Third Millennium B.C.  In Michel Fortin and Olivier Aurenche, eds. Espace Naturel, Espace Habité en Syrie du Nord (10e–2e millénaires av. J-C.) Canadian Society for Mesopotamian Studies Bulletin 33; Travaux de la Maison de l’Orient 28 (Québec: Canadian Society for Mesopotamian Studies; Lyon: Maison de l’Orient Méditerranéen), pp. 209–28.
 Tony J. Wilkinson, Tell es-Sweyhat, Volume 1. On the Margin of the Euphrates: Settlement and Land Use at Tell es-Sweyhat and in the Upper Lake Assad Area, Syria, Oriental Institute Publications 124, 2004, 
 Holland, Thomas A. 2006. Excavations at Tell es-Sweyhat, Syria, Volume 2: Archaeology of the Bronze Age, Hellenistic, and Roman Remains at an Ancient Town on the Euphrates River. Oriental Institute Publications 125. Chicago: Oriental Institute, 
Danti, Michael D. and Richard L. Zettler. 2006.  The Early Bronze Age in the Upper Euphrates River Valley and Northwest Jezireh, Syria. In Edgar Peltenburg, ed. Euphrates River Valley Settlement: The Carchemish Sector in the Third Millennium BC.  Levant Supplementary Series 5.  (Oxford: Council for British Research in the Levant/Oxbow Books), pp. 164–83.
Danti, Michael D. 2010.  Late Middle Holocene Climate and Northern Mesopotamia. In A. Bruce Mainwaring, Robert Giegengack, and Claudio Vita-Finzi, eds. Climate Crises in Human History.  American Philosophical Society Transactions, pp. 139–172.
 Cho, Frank Il Hwan, "Monumental Structures and Urbanism: Tell Es-Sweyhat in the Early Third Millennium B.C.E." (2001). Anthropology Senior Theses. Paper 21, University of Pennsylvania

See also
Cities of the Ancient Near East

External links
 The Tell Es-Sweyhat Expedition Page - Oriental Institute
 Status of Raqqa Museum where many site artifacts were stored

Bronze Age sites in Syria
Former populated places in Syria